One of Many Nights is the eighth studio album by the S.O.S. Band. The band's final album, it was released by Tabu Records in 1991. It includes the songs "Are You Ready", "Get Hyped on This" and "Someone I Can Love".

The single, "Sometimes I Wonder", peaked at No. 12 on the Billboard Hot R&B Singles chart.

Production
One of Many Nights was produced by Curtis Williams. It contains the first recorded appearances of the rapper Kurupt, before he signed a recording contract with Death Row Records. The album cover art was created by A&M Records co-founder Herb Alpert.

Critical reception
The Indianapolis Star called the album "a major disappointment," writing that "many of the 10 tracks suffer from rhythmic sameness, as if the writers and producers are locked on a particular beat."

Track listing

Personnel
Bruno Speight – guitars, percussion
Abdul Raoof – trumpet, percussion, background vocals
Jason Bryant – organ
Chandra Currelley – lead and background vocals

Additional personnel
Marcus Williams – drums, percussion
Gregory "Milkshake" Mayfield – trumpet
Sultan Mohammad – tenor saxophone
Lloyd L. Oby, Jr. – trombone
Rodrick Smith – alto saxophone
George "Spike" Neely, David Koenig, Eric Vaughn – percussion
Curtis Williams – percussion, keyboards, drum programming, saxophone, piano, background vocals
Larry Gittens – percussion, flugelhorn
Kurupt – vocals
Lorena Shelby, Carmen Carter – background vocals

References

External links
 One of Many Nights at Discogs

1991 albums
Tabu Records albums
The S.O.S. Band albums